Susan Mirjam Broman, married name Lönnqvist, (born 28 July 1959) is a Finnish former competitive figure skater. She is a two-time Finnish national champion (1974, 1979) and competed at the 1980 Winter Olympics in Lake Placid, New York, finishing 17th.

Competitive highlights

References 

1959 births
Finnish female single skaters
Living people
Figure skaters at the 1980 Winter Olympics
Olympic figure skaters of Finland
Sportspeople from Helsinki
20th-century Finnish women